Drownproofing is a method for surviving in water disaster scenarios without sinking or drowning. It is also famous as a class once required at the Georgia Institute of Technology.

History
Drownproofing was developed by swimming coach Fred Lanoue, known to students as Crankshaft because of his limping gait. It was first taught in 1940. His method was so successful that it gained national recognition, and Georgia Tech soon made it a requirement for graduation, until 1988. The US Navy also took interest, and adopted it as part of their standard training.  It is claimed that during Lanoue's time teaching at Tech from 1936 to 1964, he taught drownproofing to some 20,000 students.

Once they had mastered the Drownproofing technique, students learned to stay afloat with their wrists and ankles bound, swim  underwater, and retrieve diving rings from the bottom of the pool using their teeth. Lanoue published a book called Drownproofing, a New Technique for Water Safety in 1963. Georgia Tech dropped the course from its curriculum in 1988, as part of a downsizing of its physical education and athletics department.

Drownproofing has been for many years widely taught to recruits in the U.S. Navy, U.S. Marine Corps, and U.S. Coast Guard.

Reagh "Doc" Wetmore, swimming coach at Boston University, shared Fred Lanoue's enthusiasm for Drownproofing and continued to teach the technique until his retirement at the end of 2005.

Technique

In Drownproofing terminology, the great majority of people are "floaters". That is to say that, with the lungs fully inflated, they have slightly less specific gravity than water and will not start to sink until they exhale. An average floater has  of positive buoyancy in fresh water. "Sinkers" can also benefit from a modified technique, but will find it more difficult to learn and will probably need specialised coaching.

In the Drownproofing survival technique, the subject floats in a relaxed, near-vertical posture, with the top of the head just above the surface. Using the arms or legs to exert a downward pressure, the subject raises himself sufficiently so that the mouth is above the surface and a breath is taken, before dropping back into the relaxed float. This is done several times a minute (typically between 5 and 10), depending upon the needs of the individual. It is important to keep the lungs fully inflated for the maximum possible time and to exhale and inhale rapidly when a breath is taken.
The technique is easy to learn and does not require arduous training or a high standard of physical fitness. With practice, it is possible to remain afloat in this way for a long time with minimal effort. Lanoue taught his students to perform the technique with hands and feet tied, thus demonstrating that it is possible to survive even when injured or otherwise disabled.

Criticism

The main criticism of Drownproofing is that, with the body almost totally immersed, heat loss will be greater than with vigorous swimming or treading water, with the consequent earlier onset of hypothermia. But other sources suggest that heat loss is increased by vigorous action, because it displaces relatively warmer water that is trapped by the subject's clothing. In any cold water situation, the main objective should be to get out of the water and find shelter and dry clothing. In any case, Drownproofing should never be regarded as a substitute for the normal safety precautions recommended for any water activity.

The effects of heat loss can be reduced by using the Heat Escape Lessening Posture (H.E.L.P). The Heat Escape Lessening Posture was designed for use with a Personal Flotation Device. Essentially the person grabs his/her knees to reduce surface area exposed to the water and centralize body heat. It can be adapted and used as part of the drownproofing technique, but is far more challenging.

References

Further reading
 LANOUE, FRED “Drownproofing, A New Technique for Water Safety” Prentice-Hall, 1963. Published in the UK by Herbert Jenkins in 1964 and as a paperback in 1966 by Pan Books. 
 WETMORE, REAGH C. “Drownproofing Techniques for Floating, Swimming and Open–water Survival“ The Stephen Green Press, 1981

External links
 drownproofing.com
 lifesavingclub.com
 Drownproofing – Article in Tech Topics by Dan Apostolu, summer 2000.
  – Article by Kay Cassill about Doc Wetmore and his Drownproofing philosophy.  People, June 18, 1979, Vol. 11 No. 24

Georgia Tech
Drowning